Rafał Kozielewski (born 15 April 1976 in Wrocław) is a Polish judoka.

Achievements

References

1976 births
Living people
Polish male judoka
Sportspeople from Wrocław